The Taichung Metropolitan Park is an urban park in Xitun District, Taichung, Taiwan.

Geography
The park has an area of 88 hectares and located at the top of Dadu Plateau with an altitude of 310 meters.

Architecture
The park consists of plants observation area, sundial, therapeutic waterway, ecological pond, moon corridor, star observation plaza, aromatic and nectarous plant area etc. It has also facilities such as visitor center, exhibition room, physical fitness activity area, outdoor show performing plaza and audiovisual room.

Transportation
The park is accessible by bus from Taichung Station of Taiwan Railways.

See also
 List of parks in Taiwan

References

External links

 

Parks in Taichung